The Cochin State Manual was a 1911 CE publication of the erstwhile Kingdom of Cochin, detailing the social, economic, and historical conditions of the state. It was compiled by C. Achutha Menon (1862-1937), secretary to the Devaswom of Cochin, and bore close similarity to the district manuals and gazetteers of the British Raj.

See also
 Travancore State Manual
 Devaswom boards in Kerala

References

History of Kerala
Gazetteers of India
History books about India
Indian books
1911 non-fiction books